Mongonui was a parliamentary electorate in the Far North District in the Northland region of New Zealand, from 1861 to 1870. It was represented by three Members of Parliament.

Population centres
In the 1860 electoral redistribution, the House of Representatives increased the number of representatives by 12, reflecting the immense population growth since the original electorates were established in 1853. The redistribution created 15 additional electorates with between one and three members, and Mongonui was one of the single-member electorates. The electorates were distributed to provinces so that every province had at least two members. Within each province, the number of registered electors by electorate varied greatly.

The electorate was formed through the Representation Act 1860, which describes its area as follows:

This electoral district comprises so much of the North Island as lies to the north of a line from the head of False Hokianga Harbour to the summit of Maungataniwha Mountain, and thence to the mouth of the Pupuke River, at the head of Wangaroa Harbour, including the adjacent islands.

Population centres that thus fell within the electorate included Kaitaia and Mangonui (which was spelled Mongonui before the 1880s).

The next electoral redistribution in 1865 affected South Island electorates only. The subsequent 1870 electoral redistribution abolished the Mongonui electorate. The Mongonui electorate went to the new  electorate in its entirety, and the northern part of the  electorate formed the balance.

History
The first representative was William Butler, who won the 1861 election. Butler retired at the end of the parliamentary term in 1866. He was succeeded by Thomas Ball, who was elected unopposed on 21 March 1866, but resigned in 1870. Thomas Gillies, who had previously held two Otago electorates, won the resulting .

Members of Parliament
The Mongonui electorate was represented by three Members of Parliament.

Key

Notes

References

Historical electorates of New Zealand
Far North District
Politics of the Northland Region
1860 establishments in New Zealand
1870 disestablishments in New Zealand